Mysterium is a first person dungeon crawl game developed by Maxis and published by Asmik Ace Entertainment in February 1991 for the Nintendo Game Boy.

Reception

The four reviewers for Electronic Gaming Monthly offered mixed opinions on the game.

References

External links

1991 video games
Dungeon crawler video games
Fantasy video games
First-person video games
Game Boy games
Game Boy-only games
Video games developed in the United States
Maxis games
Single-player video games